Atlanta is a genus of pelagic marine gastropod molluscs in the family Atlantidae.  They are sometimes called heteropods.

Distribution 

All of the nineteen species but one, Atlanta californiensis, dwell in tropical and subtropical waters. The majority of species (ten) are cosmopolitan and, among the remaining nine species, five are Indo-Pacific, two are restricted to the Pacific Ocean, one is Indo-Atlantic, and one is limited to the Atlantic Ocean.

They are floating or swimming snails in tropical and subtropical seas. Most have a cosmopolitan distribution, but A. brunnea, A. pulchella and A. quoyi are only found in American waters. A. fusca, A. pacifica and A. rosea are restricted the seas around Japan.

Description
It has been recognized by several authors that identification of species in this genus is difficult and is dependent on their morphology of eyes, radula and operculum.

Main diagnostic features include: the shell and keel are calcareous; larval shell becomes the spire in the adult shell.

Snails of this genus are very small. Their coiled, calcareous shell has a diameter of less than 1 cm. The protoconch of the larval shell is retained after metamorphosis and becomes the spire of the adult shell. The number of spire whirls varies from 2½ (in the A. lesueuri- group) to 6 (A. gibbosa) and is thus also helpful in the identification of a species. The spire shape differs between the species groups, from very small (A. lesueuri- group), to inflated or flat (A. inflata- group ) to large (A.inclinata- group and  A. gibbosa- group).

They can retract into their shell and close it off with an operculum. This operculum is cartilaginous and flexible. In 1961 Richter distinguished three types of the operculum in which the larval gyre of the operculum is apical. This gyre can be relatively somewhat larger (macro-oligogyre), smaller (micro-oligogyre) or a single gyre (monogyre).

The eye morphology also consists of three types with differences in pigmented region between the lens and the retina.

The radula is typically taenioglossate with one central (rachidian) tooth, with on each side one lateral tooth and two marginal teeth. In 13 species the number of tooth rows increases during growth (Type I), while in 8 species the radula has a limited number of tooth rows (Type II).

Identification
Many authors (e.g., Thiriot-Quiévreux, 1973, p. 240; Richter, 1974, p. 60; Seapy, 1990, p. 107) admit that identification of Atlanta species is difficult and including soft-part features (eyes, radula, operculum) or application of transmitted light to observe inner shell structures (Richter, 1987, p. 178) are very helpful in distinguishing species with similar shells. However, such methods are unavailable for fossil material. This makes identifying fossil species of Atlanta quite difficult and even well-preserved specimens occasionally can only be related to existing taxa with a query (e.g., Atlanta sp. in Janssen, 2004, p. 108; Atlanta cf. echinogyra in Jansen 2007). Advantageous in this study of fossil atlantids, however, is the fact that all specimens are preserved as opaque aragonitic shells as a result of recrystallisation, which facilitates assessing protoconch shape and ornament with a normal 25 or 50× binocular magnification, they are thus much easier studied than in the usually very transparent and shiny Recent specimens. Still, here, too, study of the larval shell shape and micro-ornamentation by SEM is highly desirable or even indispensable.

Species
Atlanta includes a large number of Recent species. Lalli & Gilmer (1989) listed 14 species, but Richter & Seapy (1999) recognised 21 extant species, provisionally subdivided into seven 'species groups' (and one species unassigned). A further Recent species was described since; Atlanta selvagensis de Vera & Seapy, 2006.

Species in the genus Atlanta include:

† Atlanta arenularia Gougerot & Braillon, 1965 - this is the oldest known Atlanta from the Bartonian of the Paris Basin
 Atlanta brunnea J. E. Gray, 1850 - synonym: Atlanta fusca Eydoux & F. L. A. Souleyet, 1852
 Atlanta californiensis Seapy & Richter, 1993
 Atlanta echinogyra Richter, 1972
 Atlanta fragilis Richter, 1993
 Atlanta frontieri Richter, 1993
 Atlanta gaudichaudi Souleyet, 1852
 Atlanta helicinoidea J. E. Gray, 1850
 Atlanta inclinata J. E. Gray, 1850
 Atlanta inflata J. E. Gray, 1850
 Atlanta lesueurii J. E. Gray, 1850
 † Atlanta lingayanensis Janssen, 2007 - from Pliocene of Philippines
 Atlanta meteori Richter, 1972
 Atlanta oligogyra Tesch, 1906
 Atlanta peronii Lesueur, 1817
 Atlanta plana Richter, 1972
 Atlanta pulchella Verrill, 1884
 Atlanta quoyii Gray, 1850
 † Atlanta richteri Janssen, 2007 - from Pliocene of Philippines
 Atlanta rosea Souleyet, 1852
 † Atlanta seapyi Janssen, 2007 - from Pliocene of Philippines
 Atlanta selvagensis de Vera & Seapy, 2006
 Atlanta tokiokai van der Spoel & Troost, 1972
 Atlanta turriculata d'Orbigny, 1836
Species brought into synonymy
 Subgenus Atlanta (Heliconoides) d'Orbigny, 1835: synonym of Heliconoides d'Orbigny, 1835
 Atlanta bulimoides d'Orbigny, 1834: synonym of Limacina bulimoides (d'Orbigny, 1834)
 Atlanta fusca Souleyet, 1852: synonym of Atlanta brunnea J. E. Gray, 1850
 Atlanta gaudichaudii Souleyet, 1852: synonym of Atlanta gaudichaudi J. E. Gray, 1850
 Atlanta gibbosa Souleyet, 1852: synonym of Atlanta inclinata J. E. Gray, 1850
 Atlanta helicinoides Souleyet, 1852: synonym of Atlanta helicinoidea J. E. Gray, 1850
 Atlanta inclinata Souleyet, 1852: synonym of Atlanta inclinata J. E. Gray, 1850
 Atlanta inflata Souleyet, 1852: synonym of Atlanta inflata J. E. Gray, 1850
 Atlanta inflata d'Orbigny, 1834: synonym of Heliconoides inflata (d'Orbigny, 1834)
 Atlanta lamanoni Gray, 1850: synonym of Protatlanta souleyeti (E. A. Smith, 1888)
 Atlanta lesueurii Souleyet, 1852: synonym of Atlanta lesueurii J. E. Gray, 1850
 Atlanta lesueurii d'Orbigny, 1835: synonym of Limacina lesueurii (d'Orbigny, 1835)
 Atlanta quoyana Smith, 1888: synonym of Atlanta quoyii J. E. Gray, 1850
 Atlanta steindachneri Oberwimmer, 1898: synonym of Atlanta peronii Lesueur, 1817
 Atlanta trochiformis d'Orbigny, 1834: synonym of Limacina trochiformis (d'Orbigny, 1834)

Based on similar morphologies, these species have been placed in seven species groups:

Tesch (1908) was the first to group together the species of Atlanta sharing similar morphologies. He recognized four species groups; the Atlanta peronii-, Atlanta inflata-, Atlanta turriculata-, and Atlanta inclinata-groups. In addition to these four, three additional ones are currently recognized; the Atlanta lesueurii-, Atlanta gaudichaudi- and Atlanta gibbosa groups. Except for Tesch's Atlanta turriculata-group, the composition of Tesch's species groups has changed by species invalidations, the addition of new species over time, and addition of three new species groups. The main changes in Tesch's species groups have occurred in the Atlanta peronii-group (with Atlanta gaudichaudi and Atlanta lesueurii now forming their own species groups) and the Atlanta inclinata-group (the Atlanta gibbosa now forming its own group).

References
This article incorporates CC BY-3.0 text from references.

 Richter G. & Seapy R.R. 1999. Heteropoda, pp. 621–647. In: D. Boltovskoy (ed.), South Atlantic Zooplankton. Leiden: Backhuys Publ.
 Gofas, S.; Le Renard, J.; Bouchet, P. (2001). Mollusca, in: Costello, M.J. et al. (Ed.) (2001). European register of marine species: a check-list of the marine species in Europe and a bibliography of guides to their identification. Collection Patrimoines Naturels, 50: pp. 180–213 
 Rolán E., 2005. Malacological Fauna From The Cape Verde Archipelago. Part 1, Polyplacophora and Gastropoda.
 Rosenberg, G., F. Moretzsohn, and E. F. García. 2009. Gastropoda (Mollusca) of the Gulf of Mexico, Pp. 579–699 in Felder, D.L. and D.K. Camp (eds.), Gulf of Mexico–Origins, Waters, and Biota. Biodiversity. Texas A&M Press, College Station, Texas.
 Spencer, H.; Marshall. B. (2009). All Mollusca except Opisthobranchia. In: Gordon, D. (Ed.) (2009). New Zealand Inventory of Biodiversity. Volume One: Kingdom Animalia. 584 pp

External links
 Marco Oliverio, Gastropoda Prosobranchia, Biol. Mar. Mediterr. (2008), 15 (suppl.): 235–278
 Oliverio, Marco (2006). Gastropoda Prosobranchia Caenogastropoda, in: Revisione della Checklist della fauna marina italiana

Atlantidae
Bartonian first appearances
Extant Eocene first appearances